Uttar Pradesh State Industrial Development Authority (UPSIDA), formerly UP State Industrial Development Corporation, is a corporation of Government of Uttar Pradesh, which promotes industries and develops industrial infrastructure in the State. Its industrial areas are equipped with infrastructure facilities likes roads, drains, internal power lines, street lights, etc.

Corporation has developed 159 Industrial areas (including Uttarakhand) and 23 residential areas encompassing 41948 acres of land with a wide range of infrastructure facilities.

The Corporation comes under the Department of Infrastructure and Industrial Development of the Government of Uttar Pradesh.

History 
UPSIDC was incorporated as a company limited by shares on 29 March 1961. Its authorized capital is ₹40 crores and paid-up share capital is ₹24,07,51,000 as on March, 2015. It is one of the six infrastructure sector State Public sector enterprises, other five being, Uttar Pradesh State Bridge Corporation Limited (UPSBCL), Uttar Pradesh Project and Tubewell (UPPT), Uttar Pradesh State Road Transport Corporation (UPSRTC), Uttar Pradesh Rajkiya Nirman Nigam Ltd. (UPRRNL) and Avash Vikas Parishad (Housing Development Corporation).

Functions 
Uttar Pradesh State Industrial Development Corporation is a Public Sector Undertaking of the Government of Uttar Pradesh. It promotes the development of industrial infrastructure in the state of Uttar Pradesh, it has helped in development of industrial areas, and has delivered iconic industrial areas. The objective of UPSIDC is to provide contemporary infrastructure facilities and services to entrepreneurs setting up businesses and factories in the state of Uttar Pradesh.

Corporation has its head office in Kanpur, Uttar Pradesh and has 21 regional offices across major cities in the State including one in Lucknow.

The Managing Director is the head of UPSIDC. Shri Rajesh Kumar is the current Managing Director of the Corporation.

Projects 
 Trans Ganga Hi-tech city, Unnao
 Textile Parks
 Apparel Park, Tronica City, Ghaziabad
 Textile & Hosiery Park, Rooma, Kanpur
 Textile Park, Varanasi
 Agro Parks
 Agro Park, Barabanki
 Agro Park, Varanasi
 Leather Technology Park, Banther, Kanpur
 Export Promotion Industrial Parks
 EPIP, Greater Noida
 EPIP, Agra
 Industrialization Zone
 GIDA, Gorakhpur
 FIDA, Faizabad
 NIDA, Noida
 Special Economic Zone
 SEZ, Moradabad
 SEZ, Bhadohi
 Tronica city, Ghaziabad

See also 
 Government of Uttar Pradesh
 Special economic zone
 Free trade zones

References

External links 
Official website of UPSIDC
Uttar Pradesh Government
Uttar Pradesh : State Development Report

State industrial development corporations of India
State agencies of Uttar Pradesh
Companies based in Kanpur
Indian companies established in 1961
1961 establishments in Uttar Pradesh
Government agencies established in 1961